This is a list of the National Register of Historic Places listings in Cooke County, Texas.

This is intended to be a complete list of properties and districts listed on the National Register of Historic Places in Cooke County, Texas. There are one district and seven individual properties listed on the National Register in the county. Five individually listed properties are Recorded Texas Historic Landmarks including one State Antiquities Landmark. The district includes an additional Recorded Texas Historic Landmark.

Current listings

The locations of National Register properties and districts may be seen in a mapping service provided.

|}

See also

National Register of Historic Places listings in Texas
Recorded Texas Historic Landmarks in Cooke County

References

External links

Registered Historic Places
Cooke County
Buildings and structures in Cooke County, Texas